Netball in Solomon Islands is a popular sport, usually played by girls on Saturdays during the winter, though games can be played at all times of the year.

National Competitions
The Our Telekom InterProvincial netball competition was held in December 2010. Honiara won the title, and Makira took second place. At the award ceremony, Rennell and Bellona Province won the hosting rights for Islands' 2011 U21 championships that are to be held in June 2011.

References

Bibliography

External links 
Oceania Sport